Niğde Ömer Halisdemir University (Formerly known as "Nigde University" until 2016) is a public higher educational institution located in Niğde, Central Anatolia in Turkey. It has six faculties, two institutes, two colleges and six vocational colleges.

The university was renamed in honor of Sgt. Maj. Ömer Halisdemir (1974–2016), a non-commissioned officer, who was killed on duty in the night of 2016 Turkish coup d'état attempt, right after he shot dead a pro-coup general and prevented so the coupists capture the headquarters of the Special Forces Command in Ankara. He is remembered as a major contributor to the failure of the coup attempt. He was a native of Çukurkuyu town in Bor, Niğde.

Academic units
Faculties
Engineering
Science and Letters
Economics and Business Administration
Education
Architecture
Agricultural Sciences and Technologies

Institutes
Social Sciences
Sciences

Colleges
Physical Education and Sports
Niğde Zübeyde Hanım Health Sciences

Vocational colleges (VC)
Niğde Social Sciences VC
Bor VC
Niğde Zübeyde Hanım Health Services VC
Ulukışla VC
Bor Halil Zöhre Ataman VC

Affiliations
The university is a member of the Caucasus University Association.

References

Education in Niğde
State universities and colleges in Turkey
Educational institutions established in 1992
Buildings and structures in Niğde Province
1992 establishments in Turkey